The 2019 Nigerian House of Representatives elections in Plateau State was held on February 23, 2019, to elect members of the House of Representatives to represent Plateau State, Nigeria.

Overview

Summary

Results

Barkin Ladi/Riyom 
A total of 6 candidates registered with the Independent National Electoral Commission to contest in the election. PDP candidate Simon Mwadkwon won the election, defeating APC Bitrus Dangwel Tawal and 4 other party candidates. Mwadkwon received 72.06% of the votes, while Tawal received 27.79%.

Bokkos/Mangu 
A total of 8 candidates registered with the Independent National Electoral Commission to contest in the election. PDP candidate Solomon Maren won the election, defeating APC Haruna Danjuma. Maren received 49.97% of the votes, while Danjuma received 40.98%.

Jos North/Bassa 
A total of 15 candidates registered with the Independent National Electoral Commission to contest in the election. APC candidate Haruna Maitala won the election, defeating PDP Jonathan Dabo and 13 other party candidates. Maitala received 48.52% of the votes, while Dabo received 47.87%.

Jos South/Jos East 
A total of 12 candidates registered with the Independent National Electoral Commission to contest in the election. PDP candidate Dachung Musa Bagos won the election, defeating APC Pam Dongs and 10 other candidates. Bagos received 75.01% of the votes, while Dongs received 24.09%.

Kanke/Pankshin/Kanam 
A total of 10 candidates registered with the Independent National Electoral Commission to contest in the election. APC candidate Gagdi Adamu Yusuf won the election, defeating PDP Timothy Golu and 8 other candidates. Yusuf received 49.84% of the votes, while Golu received 48.98%.

Langtang North/Langtang South 
A total of 4 candidates registered with the Independent National Electoral Commission to contest in the election. PDP candidate Beni Lar won the election, defeating APC Nandang Bako and 2 other party candidates. Lar received 65.76% of the votes, while Bako received 33.48%.

Mikang/Qua’an/Pan/Shedam 
A total of 8 candidates registered with the Independent National Electoral Commission to contest in the election. APC candidate Komsol Longgap won the election, defeating PDP Johnbull Shekarau and 6 other party candidates. Longgap received 56.14% of the votes, while Shekarau  received 43.04%.

Wase 
A total of 8 candidates registered with the Independent National Electoral Commission to contest in the election. APC candidate Ahmed Idris won the election, defeating PDP Suleiman Umar and 6 other party candidates. Idris received 54.94% of the votes, while Umar received 44.59%.

References 

Plateau
Plateau State elections